MacDonald "Mac" Gargan is a supervillain appearing in American comic books published by Marvel Comics. The character is usually depicted as an adversary of the superhero Spider-Man. Created by Stan Lee and Steve Ditko, he first appeared in The Amazing Spider-Man #19 (December 1964) as a private investigator hired by J. Jonah Jameson to learn how Peter Parker took pictures of Spider-Man. In the following issue, Jameson decided to turn Gargan into a deadly adversary for Spider-Man through a barely-tested procedure, which left Gargan with an unremovable scorpion-themed armor and the predatory instincts of the arachnid. Driven insane by his mutation, Gargan instead turned to a life of crime as the Scorpion, and went on to menace both Spider-Man and Jameson, whom he held responsible for his transformation. Since then, having finally removed the armor, Gargan has also served as the third host of the Venom symbiote, and a member of the Dark Avengers as Spider-Man, but eventually returned to his Scorpion alias as it kept him alive due to the strain both the neural-armors and symbiote put on his body.

Since his debut during the Silver Age of Comic Books, the character has featured in various Marvel-endorsed products and media adaptations, such as feature films, television series and video games. He made his live-action debut in the Marvel Cinematic Universe film Spider-Man: Homecoming (2017), portrayed by Michael Mando.

Publication history

The character was created by Stan Lee and Steve Ditko. Gargan first appeared in The Amazing Spider-Man #19 (December 1964) and first appeared as the "Scorpion" in The Amazing Spider-Man #20 (January 1965). He also appeared as the main antagonist of the first two issues of Ms. Marvel (Ms Marvel #1-2, January 1977).

Years later, he became the third "Venom" in Marvel Knights: Spider-Man #10 (2005) and the third "Spider-Man" in Dark Avengers #1 (2009). He appeared as a regular character in the Dark Avengers series from issue #1 (March 2009) through issue #16 (June 2010). Mac Gargan appeared in the character's first own four-issue miniseries, Dark Reign: Sinister Spider-Man. The comic was released in June 2009 and was written by Brian Reed, with art by Chris Bachalo. In 2010, Gargan returned as Scorpion, in the "Big Time" story arc from The Amazing Spider-Man.

Fictional character biography

Scorpion
Mac Gargan was a private investigator initially hired by J. Jonah Jameson to find out how Peter Parker is able to obtain incredible pictures of Spider-Man. Gargan's efforts set off Peter's spider-sense and the teen easily evades the detective. Jameson then decides to hire Gargan as the subject of a barely-tested process that would endow him with the useful characteristics of a particular animal with the help of Dr. Farley Stillwell. Dr. Stillwell also outfits him with a club-like mechanical tail. In this case, a scorpion is the base for the purposes of creating a powerful agent capable of defeating Spider-Man as the scorpion is a natural predator of the spider. The Scorpion proves to be more than a match for Spider-Man, defeating him twice, but the mutagenic treatment seriously affects Gargan's mind, driving him insane as the predatory instincts of the scorpion take over. He promptly turns on his benefactor but Spider-Man intervenes, and finally defeats the Scorpion in their third battle. The Scorpion becomes a professional criminal and returns to indulge in a vendetta against Spider-Man and Jameson, only to be defeated again.

He is later hired by a spy ring to follow S.H.I.E.L.D. agent Sharon Carter, but is defeated by Captain America. Scorpion is acquired by Mr. Kline, who creates an android duplicate of him. The real Scorpion and Mr. Hyde launch a campaign of terror against S.H.I.E.L.D. agents, but are defeated by Captain America and the Falcon. After being released from prison for good behavior, the Scorpion hunts down Spider-Man and tries drowning him in a cement vat, hoping to use the boost to his reputation to become an underworld boss. Scorpion learns that Spider-Man survived the encounter, and the Jackal gives him the hero's location. The Scorpion arrives at a hospital room with Peter Parker and his Aunt May. Not recognizing Spider-Man in his civilian identity, he threatens May and demands to know where Spider-Man is. After she faints, Scorpion rampages through the hospital. A furious Spider-Man beats the Scorpion and makes him apologize to May.

The Scorpion fights Ms. Marvel after a botched revenge attempt against Jameson; the Scorpion becomes more psychotic than usual after this, resulting in his being dumped in acid. In the sewers, his sanity deteriorating, Scorpion comes to believe that his costume cannot be taken off. After a quick encounter, Spider-Man proves that his belief of being a monster is only in his mind. Gargan forms an extortion racket to sabotage the Daily Bugle, but is thwarted by Spider-Man and Captain America. He is freed from prison by agents of Egghead, who wants him to join the third Masters of Evil alongside Whirlwind and Moonstone. The team fight the Avengers but are defeated. Scorpion kidnaps Jameson's bride Marla Madison on their wedding day but she is rescued by Spider-Man. Jonah publicly confesses to his role in creating the Scorpion when the Hobgoblin tries to use that secret to blackmail him. Despite his encounters with other foes, Scorpion has always had a special hatred for Spider-Man and Jameson, which extends to when he attempts to become a mercenary for Justin Hammer, who has the Scorpion's battlesuit modified. He ruins his prospects on his first mission, to capture a war hero, when he cannot resist creating a hostage situation simply to bring Jameson to him for revenge. In reaction, while Spider-Man in cooperation with the police are dealing with Gargan, Hammer sends Blacklash and Rhino to subdue Gargan and confiscate the tail enhancement equipment for abrogating his contract.

During the "Acts of Vengeance," he tries to enter Canada to avoid the Super Power Registration Act. The Tinkerer meets him at the airport and provides him with a modified scorpion tail for his costume. He, Asp, Nekra, and Owl (who are under the control of Llan the Sorcerer) are repelled by Alpha Flight and Gamma Flight. He is then hired by the Chameleon to kill a depowered Spider-Man. He is defeated by the Black Cat. The Scorpion's constant defeats at the hands of Spider-Man drive him to depression. He wanders the sewers, his mind becoming clearer than it had been since his transformation, and decides to quit being the Scorpion. He encounters a depressed and crisis-ridden Spider-Man. Ignoring Gargan's plea that he is a changed man, Spider-Man beats him savagely. In his next appearance, Gargan is back to being psychopathic. He battles and is defeated by Spider-Man's clone Ben Reilly.

Scorpion temporarily works for Roxxon and helps them in their phony "rehabilitation therapy". Roxxon updates the Scorpion's powers and costume and promises he will get back at his enemies. Spider-Man convinces Scorpion that he is only being used. Scorpion then turns on Roxxon and is then defeated by Spider-Man. Gargan reappears in the aftermath of the Secret War that was organized by Nick Fury against Latveria. He is among the supervillains who were supplied with enhanced technology by Latverian dictator Lucia von Bardas and sent to attack the heroes involved in Fury's Secret War. The villains' technologies are hijacked by von Bardas, supplying her with power, potentially at the cost of the villains' lives, but the assembled heroes defeat von Bardas and apprehend Scorpion and the others.

Venom

Later on, through circumstances yet to be revealed, Norman Osborn reveals Spider-Man's true identity to Gargan and gives him orders to kidnap Peter's Aunt May should Osborn ever be captured and imprisoned. When Spider-Man defeats Osborn, he is imprisoned and Gargan carries out Osborn's orders in kidnapping Aunt May. Gargan eventually summons Peter and tells him the only way he can see his aunt again is to break Norman out of jail. Shortly thereafter, the Venom symbiote approaches Gargan, offering him new abilities, and Gargan becomes bonded with the creature. This would later give him an extra edge as part of Norman Osborn's Sinister Twelve. Even with these additional powers he is still swiftly defeated by Spider-Man, as Captain America, Iron Man, Daredevil, Yellowjacket and the Fantastic Four deal with the rest of the Twelve. Though incarcerated, Gargan is unfazed, as with his new powers come the respect of becoming an "A-list" villain at last.

Alongside Spider-Man and other villains and heroes, Venom is kidnapped by other-dimensional forces. He succeeds in killing Spider-Man, who is really the original Space Phantom in disguise. For his crimes, the Inhumans matriarch Medusa orders his execution and almost carries it out herself. Later, he tries to kill the other participants for the Beyonder's wish fulfillment prize for the winner, but fails and is returned to Earth alongside the rest of the group.

Thunderbolts
Gargan later becomes a member of a sub-group of the Thunderbolts, which has been drafted by the Avengers to hunt down the members of the fugitive Secret Avengers and is currently run by the Commission for Superhuman Activities. It is then revealed that he has been outfitted with electrical implants by the government to keep the Venom symbiote in check. As a Thunderbolt, he is seen as a hero by the general public and has his own action figures. Gargan displays his new raw power as Venom in a battle with Jack Flag, after pummeling Flag for a bit, the hero manages to stab Gargan, who is protected by the symbiote. Gargan becomes enraged and ferociously man-handles Flag, and is about to eat him when his electrical implants kick in and temporarily subdue him, allowing Flag to live. Gargan expresses fear of the control the symbiote possesses over him, yet he has become addicted to the raw unearthly power it brings to him and cannot even begin to imagine life without it, similar to a drug addict. An attack from Steel Spider and Sepulchre makes him lose control again, briefly becoming a huge monster once more, while Moonstone is incapacitated and thus cannot coordinate control of his electrical implants. Afterwards he returns to a normal form with no ill effects. He also bites off and devours Steel Spider's arm during a fight.

Gargan is later ordered by Osborn to hunt down Namor. After shooting him with a Thunderbolts-supplied weapon, Gargan disables Namor by ripping off his feet-wings. The Sub-Mariner manages to render Gargan unconscious and then rips out the symbiote's tongue, although the symbiote easily makes a new one. Gargan begins to hallucinate that the symbiote is speaking to him, telling him to "feed (it)". He later attacks and devours a guard and declares that "the only way out of Thunderbolts Mountain is when I decide to let you die". It is later revealed that the psychic criminal Bluestreak is controlling Gargan's actions, although it is uncertain whether the symbiote was actually speaking to him or not. Venom goes up against the Swordsman, who stabs Gargan through the chest, using his powers to force the symbiote away from his sword. Gargan is wounded, but lives. After healing, he retains his monstrous form, rarely returning to his usual size.

"New Ways to Die"
Gargan reappears during the "New Ways to Die" story arc of The Amazing Spider-Man, no longer possessing the knowledge of Spider-Man's secret identity. Gargan and the Thunderbolts are called back to New York to capture Spider-Man. While on a search for the wall-crawler, Gargan's symbiote senses a former host nearby. Gargan suspects that it is Spider-Man but instead finds Eddie Brock at the F.E.A.S.T center (a soup kitchen). The Venom symbiote attempts to leave Gargan to re-bond with Brock, much to Gargan's (and Brock's) dismay. Upon making contact with Brock, his skin is shown to be caustic to his former symbiote, and as a white substance seeps out of his pores covering his body, Brock uses the Anti-Venom symbiote and battles Gargan. With some help from Spider-Man, Anti-Venom subdues Venom and nearly destroys the symbiote. Norman Osborn uses a sample of Anti-Venom's DNA from Mac Gargan and creates a poisonous counter to its healing powers by combining the sample with the immune system of Freak. Mac Gargan is injected with the "cure" and is given a new Scorpion battlesuit, which contains the venom, until the symbiote can recover. Anti-Venom tracks down Gargan at Oscorp. After a grueling battle "Ven-orpion" injects the toxin into Anti-Venom and seemly kills the suit. He then attempts to kill Brock but the symbiote tries holding him back, still feeling love for its former host. The symbiote gains its strength and breaks though the Scorpion suit. Gargan gives up but promises that he will get past this problem and will someday finish Brock.

Secret Invasion
Gargan was seen being thrown from Thunderbolt Mountain by Captain Marvel. Gargan was later seen with the other Thunderbolts in Washington. The Skrulls attempt to trick him into killing normal humans in order to find out which of them are Skrulls. Osborn attempted to prevent the symbiote from killing anyone by threatening to kill Mac Gargan and promising to help satisfy his "urges" later, only for Gargan to reveal that the threat he appeared to pose to civilians was a ruse in order to draw out a disguised Skrull. Venom played a huge part in fighting the Skrulls. He was seen slashing and eating the Skrulls all at once. He soon joins the Thunderbolts and the remaining heroes for the final battle against the Skrulls. During the battle, he was a force to be reckoned with.

Venom, along with most of the Thunderbolts team, attempts to kill partner Songbird on the orders of Osborn. Facing Venom, Songbird was defeated and almost eaten by Venom, but escaped with help from the Swordsman.

Dark Reign

Norman Osborn forms the Dark Avengers, providing new identities to some of his former Thunderbolts. After feeding a Skrull to a hungry Venom that has become more bestial than human, Osborn gives him a medication that resets the symbiote to the size it was when it possessed Spider-Man originally. Gargan can transform into his larger Venom form at will.

Norman introduces Gargan and the symbiote as "Spider-Man" of the Dark Avengers. During their first mission against Morgana le Fay, Morgana transforms "Venom-Spidey" into a giant, demonic monster who then tries to eat Ares. Venom later coughs up Ares; however, Morgana's magic continues to affect Venom, causing him to lose and gain control of himself randomly. After Morgana is defeated in the past by Iron Patriot and Doctor Doom, Mac returned to his "Spider-Man" form with only a slight headache. Hawkeye promised to kill Mac one day for trying to eat him while he was under Morgana's control. Once they arrive home, he is seen arguing with Hawkeye.

Later, attempting to find out Norman Osborn's plans for his son Harry, the real Spider-Man, with the aid of the Invisible Woman, manages to capture Gargan by using a sonic generator and takes his place to infiltrate the Dark Avengers. Gargan is thrown into the Negative Zone, but is later seen back with the Dark Avengers.

Against Osborn's wishes, Gargan is seen heading out into the city to "fight crime" solo. At one point, he is seen defeating a bank robber called General Wolfram. After making out with two girls at once and getting cheered by a large crowd, he takes the robber to an abandoned rooftop and consumes his arm. He then takes the money Wolfram stole and swings away. Gargan is then seen at a strip club with the money and discovers his new favorite stripper. After getting reprimanded by Norman Osborn for eating Wolfram's arm, Gargan kills the stripper and places her dead body in J. Jonah Jameson's bed while he is gone in an attempt to frame him for her murder. At the same time, Redeemer visits the injured General Wolfram and recruits him alongside other villains who have had limbs bitten off by Gargan (namely Dementoid, Doctor Everything, Eleven, and Hippo) in a plan to take down "Spider-Man" (who is believed to be the root of their problem). In another attempt to antagonize Jameson, Gargan instigates a turf war between two rival street gangs, hoping to wear Jameson down through stress and exhaustion from continuously putting out stories to cover the crime wave. At the same time, the Redeemer arms his group with cybernetic limbs to defeat Spider-Man. J. Jonah Jameson goes to Osborn for help and is given Spider-Man to help solve the city's gang problem.

Gargan continues to instigate the gang war and aggravate Jameson in person. A bomb threat is placed by Redeemer to lure Spider-Man into an intervention, though Gargan instead devours Hippo and Eleven, badly injures Dementoid, and beats Doctor Everything into submission before turning him over to the police. He then eats Redeemer's limbs. With Redeemer, Wolfram, and Dementoid the only ones still remaining of the group (albeit hospitalized), Redeemer sends photos of Gargan's actions to Jameson in an attempt to expose him as a cannibalistic psychopath to the world. Jameson first goes to Osborn, who decides to cut Gargan loose by sending Bullseye and Daken (in their old costumes) to kill him. At the Big Apple Festival, the two attack him, with Dementoid, General Wolfram, and both gangs involved in the turf war entering the fray to try to kill Spider-Man. Gargan ends up defeating all of them, and J. Jonah Jameson shoots a gun in the air to stop the fight. As a result, everyone credits Jameson and Spider-Man with successfully working together to stop criminals and save the festival. Gargan later returns to Avengers Tower, where he is visited by Norman Osborn. Osborn informs him that Bullseye and Daken will get over being hurt, but warns Gargan that if he goes out of control again, he will suit up as the Iron Patriot and take care of him personally.

During the opening chapter of "Utopia," the Dark Avengers are sent into San Francisco to quell the mutant riots and battle any X-Men they can find. Tension is shown to exist between the Avengers and Osborn's own Dark X-Men. When Namor and Emma Frost are revealed to be double agents on Cyclops' side and defect with Cloak and Dagger, an irate Osborn gathers the Dark Avengers and the remaining Dark X-Men, Gargan included, ordering them to bring him Namor's head and Emma Frost's heart and to make sure that Cyclops sees them do it. The Dark Avengers and Dark X-Men attack Utopia and battle the X-Men, with Venom facing off against Colossus. Due to the sheer number of X-Men, Osborn is forced to retreat when informed that the only way to win would be to kill all the mutants on the island, an option which is not politically viable.

Gargan later begins to show signs that his medications are making him emotionally unstable. On a mission with the Dark Avengers, Osborn takes Gargan off the case when he notices Gargan's outbursts. Molecule Man turns Gargan and his symbiote into an inert pile of goo. He is later restored by the Sentry.

"Siege"
During the "Siege" storyline, Mac Gargan is with the Dark Avengers when Norman Osborn makes plans to invade Asgard. Mac Gargan and the rest of the Avengers protest. For fighting alongside the Initiative, Osborn promises to give the team their freedom from servitude. As a result, Gargan is among the mass of soldiers to launch an attack on Asgard following Loki's setup. He and the rest of the Avengers manage to overwhelm Thor. While fighting Ms. Marvel and Spider-Man after they arrive, Gargan is forcefully removed from the Venom symbiote, which takes over Ms. Marvel until Spider-Man defeats it. He, along with the other Dark Avengers, are arrested after Norman Osborn falls from power.

Return as Scorpion
During the "Big Time" storyline, Mac Gargan is seen at the Raft superprison, having been separated from the Venom symbiote: the symbiote's removal was causing medical problems due to the side effects from his original genetic mutation. Alistair Smythe breaks him out of the Raft. Gargan was then fitted with a new Scorpion suit by Smythe, which included a life-support system to stabilize Gargan's condition. Smythe convinced Gargan to join him in his plan for revenge on J. Jonah Jameson. Scorpion joins Alistair Smythe, a new villain named Fly-Girl, and some unnamed cyborg minions (each wanting revenge on Jameson) in attacking the launch site of John Jameson's latest space mission, where they sabotage the launch and hold John Jameson for ransom.

During the "Ends of the Earth" storyline, Scorpion is seen guarding one of Doctor Octopus' facilities. Titanium Man enters it and ends up fighting Scorpion. Titanium Man is defeated by Scorpion despite his best efforts.

During the "Dying Wish" storyline, Scorpion hears the call-to-arms from Peter Parker (while trapped in Doctor Octopus' dying body) to save him and apprehend Doctor Octopus (occupying Spider-Man's body) in order to save his loved ones from Doctor Octopus' final sinister scheme. Scorpion and Hydro-Man accompany Peter Parker in Doctor Octopus' body to Stark Industries to look for Tony Stark only to end up in a trap set by Doctor Octopus in Spider-Man's body. When finding a safe area containing Spider-Man's friends and relatives, Scorpion plans to have his final revenge on J. Jonah Jameson. Upon accessing the memories of Spider-Man loving Aunt May - and the times Scorpion threatened her - Doctor Octopus in Spider-Man's body retaliates by punching Scorpion so hard in the jaw (the only unprotected part of his body) that it breaks off from his head.

Scorpion was later seen in the Raft's infirmary with Boomerang and Vulture. Scorpion now sported a metal apparatus that replaced his missing jaw. Alistair Smythe's mini-Spider-Slayers heal and enhance them, and Smythe gives them an offer to kill Spider-Man. While Boomerang fights Spider-Man, Scorpion is convinced by Smythe to go after Mayor Jameson again.

During the "Secret Wars" storyline, Scorpion is among the villains at Kingpin's viewing party of the incursion between Earth-616 and Earth-1610.

As part of the "All-New, All-Different Marvel," Scorpion was secretly hired by Tiberius Stone of Alchemax to further test Alchemax's Spider-Slayers during Tiberius' trip to a foreign country to sell them. During Scorpion's test of Alchemax's Spider-Slayers, Scorpion encountered Spider-Man 2099. When Scorpion thought that Spider-Man 2099 was his Spider-Man in a different costume, he attacks him with the aid of the Spider-Slayers; Spider-Man 2099 muses that in his time the Scorpion is considered a low-key opponent for Spider-Man, but personally considers the villain a genuine threat after just a few moments fighting him. Spider-Man 2099 was able to use his holographic assistant to project a hologram of Spider-Man over Scorpion causing the Spider-Slayers to attack Scorpion until he turned them off twice.

Scorpion later doubles working for Black Cat's gang when he and a man named Lee Price partake in a black market sale that also involved Tombstone's gang. When at Black Cat's hideout, Scorpion accuses Lee Price of botching up the black market sale which Lee Price denied leading Black Cat to demand an explanation after hearing about some information from her spies at the New York City Police Department telling her what they know. After Lee Price leaves following his explanation, Scorpion becomes suspicious towards Lee. While confiding his suspicions, Mac Gargan dons a new version of the Scorpion armor. He then meets Price at the apartment of a Daily Bugle reporter, who had evidence against Black Cat. When Lee reminds him that they should scare the reporter, Scorpion attacks him causing Lee to transform into Venom and the two begin to fight. During the fight, Scorpion is nearly killed until Spider-Man intervenes, who mistook Venom for Flash Thompson.

In a prelude to the "Hunted" storyline, Scorpion is among the animal-themed characters captured by Taskmaster and Black Ant on Kraven the Hunter's behalf. He is among those who Arcade publicly reveals as the Savage Six.

Powers and abilities

As Scorpion 
Mac Gargan, as the Scorpion, was given superhuman powers through chemical and radiological treatments, include splicing his genetics with a scorpion's DNA, which produced mutagenic effects. As the result, he has arachnid-like powers similar to Spider-Man's such as superhuman strength, speed, agility, reflexes, stamina, and durability, and also can scale walls (he also punches holes in walls as a way to climb). He also has an exceptionally strong grip, reminiscent of a real scorpion's pincers. He wears a full-body battlesuit composed of two layers of light steel mesh separated by a thin layer of insulated rubber. In addition to his superhuman physique, he was traditionally armed with a cybernetically-controlled, seven-foot mechanical tail, with a tool steel articulated framework which can whip at 90 miles per hour. The tail has in the past been equipped with projectile weapons, usually an electric generator, although it has also been equipped with a spike at its tip, which can squirt an acidic spray, and a low-density plasma energy projector. The Scorpion can use his tail as an extra leg, or he can coil it behind him to spring himself a distance of at least 30 feet. The Scorpion is substantially stronger and more durable than Spider-Man, though is a much less skilled hand-to-hand combatant, and thus Spider-Man relies on his tactics and wits to defeat him.

As Venom 
With the Venom symbiote, Mac Gargan retains his superhuman abilities, some of which have increased substantially beyond the original levels. The costume can even emulate the tail of Gargan's Scorpion costume. It can also be used as a fifth limb. As Venom, Gargan has gained the ability to shoot webbing and climb walls like Spider-Man, and can disguise himself as other people or blend in with his background. He is undetectable by Spider-Man's "spider-sense". His skill as a hand-to-hand combatant has increased due to the influence of the alien symbiote, which has superior instincts and fighting experience. The costume can also heal grave injuries suffered by the host with incredible speed. Mac (as Venom) has claws on his fingers which can be used as weapons to slash his foes. He can also create tendrils to incapacitate his enemies.

When injured or enraged, Venom now has the ability to increase its mass and physical strength in order to meet whatever threat it is facing with equal force, an ability inconsistently hinted in the past, such as when Venom battled the Juggernaut. During these times it is not clear that Gargan has any control over the symbiote, for had it not been for the technology restraining Venom, he would have eaten Jack Flag. Also, during a battle with the Steel Spider, Gargan attacks innocent bystanders.

As Spider-Man 
A special "medication" provided by Norman Osborn allowed Venom to assume a smaller, more human-looking form similar to when Spider-Man had control of the symbiote. From this form, he is able to switch back to his larger, more feral form whenever he pleases. As Spider-Man, Mac seems to be even more agile than when he was as Venom. He also still has all of Venom's powers, minus the claws, tongue, and teeth, which he can regrow at will. His "medication" has also been shown to decrease his will to fight, making him more sympathetic.

Return as Scorpion 
After Smythe breaks him out of the Raft, Gargan is fitted with a new Scorpion suit. The suit is larger than its predecessor, and cybernetically wired into Gargan, making him a cyborg. It is equipped with a more powerful tail, mechanical pincers, and is bulletproof. Smythe also altered Gargan's biology, giving him a "scorpion-sense" to match Spider-Man's spider-sense. The suit is also very tough, allowing Gargan to withstand a fall at terminal speed. The armor leaves Mac's jaw unprotected, which Doctor Octopus in Spider-Man's body exploited to punch his jaw clean off. Following his employment by Alchemax, he has gained a new jaw to replace the jaw he lost.

Characterization

Personality
Before he assumed the identity of the Scorpion, Mac Gargan was a skilled, if somewhat greedy and unscrupulous, private investigator, who admitted that he would go through anything "just so long as the pay is good!" His greed still motivated him as a supervillain, albeit in a twisted way: while awaiting an official "offer" from the Thunderbolts, Gargan squeezed his agent for financial details on a proposed book, TV and movie deal ("How many back points? And residuals? Fantastic. That foreign and domestic?"), demanded certain talent for the writing (including the screenwriting brother of the comic's writer) and, finally, Gargan killed six "capekiller" S.H.I.E.L.D. agents sent to bring him in - because while he intended to cooperate, his agent had told him that the rights to his life story would be "worth a little more" if Gargan "goosed up the body count" before joining the Thunderbolts.

He is emotionally disturbed as a result of the procedure in which he acquired his powers, and retains little of his former rationality. He is typically easily outsmarted by Spider-Man and is not very good at cooperating with other supervillains or following instructions as Justin Hammer learned. His most prominent weakness is his explosive temper and irrational hatred toward J. Jonah Jameson, to the point where he has been known to ignore the orders of whomever he is working for, in order to attack the Daily Bugle's publisher. None of this has changed with his bonding to the Venom symbiote, or with his new career serving under Norman Osborn with the Thunderbolts or the Dark Avengers: in fact, the symbiote seems to have only made him even more irrational, and his new career as a "hero" has done nothing to curtail his lingering hatred of Jameson. He nearly blew his cover as Spider-Man when he started a drug war and photographs of him engaging in cannibalism wound up in J. Jonah Jameson's hands, putting his employer Norman Osborn's plans and the "heroic" status of his entire Dark Avengers team in jeopardy, just to pursue vengeance against Jameson (now the Mayor of New York) yet again. His ill-conceived and poorly thought-out plan failed, and he was forced to publicly make peace with Jameson in his Spider-Man guise, greatly embarrassing him, though he secretly fantasized about killing Jameson during the whole time while they were shaking hands.

The years of being outsmarted and beaten, despite his physical superiority over Spider-Man, complement the similar hatred possessed by the symbiote, and has allowed it to almost completely control Gargan. Unlike the other Venoms, Mac very seldom refers to himself as "we" instead of "I". Gargan has even engaged in cannibalism as Venom, severing and devouring the arm of the still-living Steel Spider. After getting "the taste of flesh", he is seen displaying even more signs of cannibalism such as eating Skrulls, consuming the bones of Swarm, devouring Eleven and the limbs of criminals, and trying to eat Ares. When the symbiote is dormant in his body he has expressed nausea and fear of the organism. Unlike Eddie Brock, any inhibitions Gargan had about harming innocent bystanders has been eliminated with his bonding to the symbiote, most likely because he had such little regard for others to begin with. Gargan's previous identity has not been completely degraded. His symbiote once sprouted a scorpion-like tail, although he has not had it since. Also, when he learned there was a new hero calling herself the Scorpion, Gargan-Venom attacked her to protect his trademark while it still lasted. Also, for a brief time, Gargan wore a new Scorpion suit while the symbiote regenerated after Anti-Venom's attack, although initially he was hesitant about wearing it alongside the symbiote.

Reception

Accolades 

In 2012, IGN ranked Mac Gargan's Venom persona 17th in their "Top 50 Avengers" list.
 In 2014, IGN ranked Mac Gargan 10th in their "Top 25 Spider-Man Villains" list.
 In 2016, Comicbook.com ranked Mac Gargan's Venom persona 4th in their "Every Venom Host In The Marvel Universe Ranked" list.
 In 2021, CBR.com ranked Mac Gargan 8th in their "10 Strongest Spider-Men" list.
 In 2021, Screen Rant ranked Mac Gargan 4th in their "10 Most Powerful Hosts Of The Venom Symbiote" list, 10th in their "Spider-Man Villains, Ranked By Fighting Ability" list, and included him in their "10 Best Marvel Legacy Villains Who Lived Up To Their Predecessor" list.
 In 2021, Newsarama included Mac Gargan in their "The greatest Venom hosts of all time" list.
 In 2022, Collider included Mac Gargan in their "10 Spider-Man Villains Fans Want to See in the MCU" list.
 In 2022, CBR.com ranked Mac Gargan 6th in their "Spider-Man's 10 Coolest Villains" list, 9th in their "10 Most Iconic Spider-Man Villains" list, 9th in their "Spider-Man: Ranking His 15 Strongest Villains" list, and 16th in their "Venom: Ranking the Strongest Symbiotes" list.
 In 2022, Screen Rant ranked Mac Gargan 2nd in their "10 Most Powerful Animal-Themed Spider-Man Villains" list.

Other versions

Exiles
In one of the many realities visited by the Exiles, Mac Gargan is one of the many superhumans that form the Heroes for Hire, and is part of the Avengers Package, which also includes the Black Widow and the Black Knight. After being hired to protect Tokyo from Moses Magnum and Namorita, Scorpion is killed by the murderous, teenage counterpart of Magik.

JLA/Avengers
In the last issue of JLA/Avengers, Scorpion is among the enthralled villains defending Krona's stronghold, and is defeated by Sandman.

Marvel Zombies
A zombified Scorpion appears in Marvel Zombies: Dead Days and Marvel Zombies 3. He is a member of the Kingpin's undead alliance. As such, he searches New York and the surrounding areas for food of any kind. He is on friendly terms with the zombie Diablo. He is eventually killed by Machine Man.

Spider-Man: Reign
Gargan appears as the Scorpion (in a highly advanced costume) in Spider-Man: Reign as a member of the Sinner Six. He dies when he is punted from an Empire State Building window by Spider-Man.

Spider-Verse
In the Spider-Verse, the Earth-001 version of Scorpion is a member of Verna's Hounds. Alongside the Earth-001 version of Rhino, Scorpion accompanied Verna to Earth-21205 to hunt Hobgoblin (who was the identity of that world's Peter Parker). They were stopped by the Spider-Woman of Earth-65.

Ultimate Marvel
The Ultimate Marvel comics feature Maximus Gargan, a tattooed Mexican mob boss that worked with the Prowler (Aaron Davis). This version is the second villain to take on the Scorpion alias, the first being a deranged, imperfect clone of Peter Parker. He is shown to have very resistant skin, but may have other powers as well. Once he arrived at New York, Gargan set his sights on becoming the new "Kingpin of New York", but was stopped by the efforts of an uneasy alliance of Spider-Man and Prowler. Before his debut, a clone of Peter Parker wearing Scorpion armor and using the Scorpion name was featured in the "Ultimate Clone Saga" arc, but was defeated and imprisoned in the Baxter Building.

In other media

Television
 Mac Gargan / Scorpion appears in Spider-Man (1967), voiced by Carl Banas. This version's villainous nature was amplified when Farley Stillwell turned him into the Scorpion.
 The Scorpion appears in the Spider-Man and His Amazing Friends episode "Attack of the Arachnoid", voiced by Neil Ross.
 Mac Gargan / Scorpion appears in Spider-Man (1994), voiced initially by Martin Landau before Richard Moll took over. Introduced in "The Sting of the Scorpion", this version is initially a neurotic, plump, and balding private eye working for J. Jonah Jameson. In an attempt to discover Spider-Man's identity, Jameson convinces Gargan to allow Dr. Farley Stillwell to use the Neogenic Recombinator to transform him into a superhero. As the Scorpion, Gargan defeats Spider-Man, but is overcome with pain as he undergoes further uncontrolled mutations that give him green skin, yellow eyes, and talon-like fingers. Driven insane and believing more radiation will return him to normal, Gargan attempts to gain access to a nuclear reactor and destroy New York in the process, but is defeated by Spider-Man and arrested. In "The Insidious Six" and "Battle of the Insidious Six", the Kingpin recruits Scorpion and five other supervillains to form the eponymous team in an attempt to kill Spider-Man, but he ultimately defeats them. In "The Final Nightmare", desperate to find a cure for his condition, Scorpion kidnaps Stillwell, but the scientist destroys the Recombinator to stop others from creating monsters like Scorpion. After saving the Vulture from an exploding building, Scorpion takes him hostage under the belief that he is smart enough to change him back. Meanwhile, Alistair Smythe, requiring Scorpion's genetic code to further his own experiments, holds Black Cat hostage to coerce Spider-Man into bringing Scorpion to him. However, Scorpion manages to escape Smythe after Vulture attacks and attempts to leave his life of crime. In the five-part episode "Six Forgotten Warriors", Scorpion rejoins the Kingpin and the Insidious Six to locate the Red Skull's doomsday device. By the episode's end, Scorpion escapes from the police and goes back to his own life.
 Mac Gargan is alluded to in The Spectacular Spider-Man episode "The Final Curtain", in which the Chameleon, disguised as Norman Osborn, thanks the private investigator on the phone for investigating Donald Menken's address. Scorpion was originally set to appear had the series continued.
 Mac Gargan / Scorpion appears in Spider-Man (2017), voiced by Jason Spisak. In his most notable appearance in the episode "The Day Without Spider-Man", he pursues an unsuccessful partnership with the Tinkerer, who uses energy from the Blood Gem to turn him into a large monster, only to be defeated by Spider-Gwen, Anya Corazon, and the Ultimate Spider-Man.

Marvel Cinematic Universe
Mac Gargan appears in media set in the Marvel Cinematic Universe (MCU).
 He first appears in the live-action film Spider-Man: Homecoming, portrayed by Michael Mando. This version takes inspiration from the mainstream and Ultimate Marvel incarnations and is depicted as a ruthless and notorious gangster with an extensive criminal record and a scorpion tattoo on his neck. He meets with Adrian Toomes' associates at the Staten Island Ferry as part of a deal to receive advanced alien weaponry. However, Spider-Man interrupts the deal and webs Gargan to the ferry before the latter gets knocked into the bay during Spider-Man's fight with Toomes. In a mid-credits scene, Gargan meets with Toomes in prison to discuss friends of the latter's who share his desire to get revenge on Spider-Man and Toomes knowing the web-slinger's identity, though Toomes denies it.
 An alternate universe incarnation of Gargan as the Scorpion will appear in the upcoming animated series Spider-Man: Freshman Year.

Film
Maximus Gargan / Scorpion appears in Spider-Man: Into the Spider-Verse, voiced by Joaquín Cosio. This version is a cybernetically-enhanced Hispanic gangster resembling a scorpion man working under the Kingpin.

Video games
 Mac Gargan / Scorpion appears as a boss in The Amazing Spider-Man (1990).
 Mac Gargan / Scorpion appears in Spider-Man 2: The Sinister Six as a member of the titular group.
 Scorpion appears in Spider-Man: The Video Game.
 Mac Gargan / Scorpion appears as a boss in Spider-Man (1995).
 Mac Gargan / Scorpion appears as a boss in Spider-Man: Lethal Foes.
 Mac Gargan / Scorpion appears as the first boss of Spider-Man (2000), voiced by Daran Norris.
 The Scorpion appears as a boss in Spider-Man (2002), voiced by Mike McColl. This version is an paranoid former test subject of a failed military experiment meant to create super-soldiers, which left him with a suit of irremovable scorpion-themed armor and super-powers.
 Mac Gargan / Scorpion appears as a boss in Spider-Man: Mysterio's Menace.
 Mac Gargan / Scorpion appears in Marvel: Ultimate Alliance, voiced by Beau Weaver. This version is a member of Doctor Doom's Masters of Evil. Additionally, the "Villain Pack" DLC introduces Gargan's Venom form as an alternate costume for Eddie Brock.
 Mac Gargan / Scorpion appears in the Spider-Man 3 film tie-in game, voiced by Dee Bradley Baker. This version retains his 2002 video game traits as a tragic anti-hero. Seeking help in removing his mechanical scorpion tail, he approaches Dr. Farley Stillwell, the head scientist of cybernetics corporation MechaBioCon (MBC), only for her to turn him into a "bounty hunter" to aid in MBC's illegal activities via a suit of armor equipped with drill hands and a mind-control helmet. While releasing the Rhino from police custody, Scorpion is confronted by Spider-Man, who was investigating MBC when he learned about what happened to Gargan from Dr. Andrews, a scientist who developed feelings for Gargan. After a fight with the mind-controlled Gargan, Spider-Man frees and join forces with him to confront Stillwell. After defeating the Rhino and rescuing Dr. Andrews, Scorpion almost kills Stillwell, but Spider-Man and Dr. Andrews persuade him not to before he escapes.
 Mac Gargan / Scorpion appears as a boss and playable character in Spider-Man: Friend or Foe, voiced by Fred Tatasciore.
 Mac Gargan / Venom appears as an unlockable playable character and boss in the PS3, Xbox 360, PS4, Xbox One, and PC versions of Marvel: Ultimate Alliance 2, voiced by Chopper Bernet. He is among the villains that are placed under mind control via nanite technology to serve the heroes' cause and can be either on the pro- or anti-registration side. Additionally, Gargan as the Scorpion appears as a boss in the Wii, PS2, and PSP versions of the game, voiced by Jim Cummings.
 Mac Gargan / Venom appears in Marvel: Avengers Alliance. This version is a member of Dell Rusk's Dark Avengers.
 Mac Gargan / Venom appears as a playable character in Spider-Man Unlimited.
 Mac Gargan / Scorpion appears as a playable character in Lego Marvel Super Heroes 2.
 Mac Gargan / Scorpion appears as a boss in Marvel's Spider-Man, voiced again by Jason Spisak. This version used to be a small-time criminal rather than a private investigator and can shoot a fatal, hallucinogenic toxin from his tail. Following his transformation into the Scorpion, he became a mercenary, which brought him into conflict with Spider-Man, who has been a superhero for eight years and is well-familiar with Scorpion. The latter is initially imprisoned at the Raft until Otto Octavius stages a prison break and recruits Gargan, among others, into his Sinister Six in exchange for expunging Gargan's criminal record and clearing his gambling debts. After the team overpowers Spider-Man, they split up to attack different Oscorp properties, with Gargan being sent to poison the city's water reservoir. Though he is foiled by Spider-Man, Gargan poisons him with his toxin and escapes while the webslinger develops a cure. Gargan later joins the Rhino at the docks, but Spider-Man arrives to confront them. After turning the villains against each other, Spider-Man locks them inside a shipping container before the police arrive to take them back into custody.
 Mac Gargan as Venom and Scorpion appear as separate playable characters in Marvel Puzzle Quest.

Collected editions

References

External links
 Mac Gargan at Marvel.com

Characters created by Stan Lee
Characters created by Steve Ditko
Comics characters introduced in 1964
Cyborg supervillains
Fictional assassins in comics
Fictional cannibals
Fictional characters from New York City
Fictional characters with superhuman durability or invulnerability
Fictional mercenaries in comics
Fictional private investigators
Incarnations of Spider-Man
Marvel Comics characters who can move at superhuman speeds
Marvel Comics characters with superhuman strength
Marvel Comics cyborgs
Marvel Comics film characters
Marvel Comics hybrids
Marvel Comics male supervillains
Marvel Comics mutates 
Marvel Comics supervillains
Spider-Man characters
Venom (character)
Villains in animated television series